Melker Schörling (born 1947) is a Swedish billionaire businessman. His investment company Melker Schörling AB (MSAB) has large interests in Securitas AB, Assa Abloy, Hexagon AB, Loomis and more. Schörling formed a partnership with fellow billionaire Gustaf Douglas, who is also a major shareholder in Securitas and Assa Abloy.

Early life
Melker Schörling is a graduate of the Gothenburg School of Business, Economics and Law.

Career
He made a name for himself as the CEO of Securitas in 1987 before moving on to Skanska, when Percy Barnevik was chair. Schörling later left his executive career to focus on his own investments.

In August 2006, Schörling revealed that he would take MSAB public, listing it on the Stockholm Stock Exchange. He also unveiled a new board of directors. The new board, one of the most high-profile in the Swedish business world, includes Stefan Persson, Carl-Henric Svanberg, and Schörling's daughter.

in 2017, Schörling left all positions in the company, citing health reasons. He has since been replaced by his daughters Sophia and Märta.

As of May 2021, he is worth US$12.5 billion according to Bloomberg Billionaires Index.

Personal life
He is married, with two children, and lives in Stockholm.

References 

Swedish businesspeople
Swedish billionaires
University of Gothenburg alumni
1947 births
Living people